"Brothers and Sisters" is an episode of the BBC sitcom, The Green Green Grass. It was first screened on 27 October 2006, as the seventh episode of series two.

Synopsis

When Marlene secretly invites her sister down to come and stay for the week, Boycie is angry and he reminds his wife that they are on the run from the Driscoll brothers who do want to shoot Boycie in the head. When Marlene's sister arrives, Bryan instantly falls in love with her. But Marlene's sister is not the only one to be visiting the Boyces, as the Driscoll brothers have followed her and are prepared to let Boycie live if he lets them hide something on his open fields. So the Driscolls leave, to see Boycie's dog, Earl, digging up the ground where the Driscoll brothers' 'thing' is buried.

Episode cast

References

British TV Comedy Guide for The Green Green Grass
BARB viewing figures

2006 British television episodes
The Green Green Grass episodes